Lipinia sekayuensis, also known as the Sekayu striped skink , is a species of skink. It is endemic to Peninsular Malaysia.

References

Lipinia
Reptiles of Malaysia
Endemic fauna of Malaysia
Reptiles described in 2014
Taxa named by Larry Lee Grismer
Taxa named by Lukman H. B. Ismail
Taxa named by Muhammad Taufik Awang
Taxa named by Syed A. Rizal
Taxa named by Amirrudin B. Ahmad